Olympikus is a Brazilian sports brand, which makes sports equipment for running and fitness. The brand is owned by Vulcabras Azaleia.

Current products by Olympikus include athletic shoes and apparel. In the past, the company also sponsored several volleyball and football teams.

History 
Olympikus was established in 1975, releasing its first series of athletic shoes made of leather (one of the first in the country). Shortly thereafter, international sports brands began to enter Brazil and Olympikus began to compete in the technological, advertising and marketing fields for space with these companies.

In the 1990s the brand became a sponsor of various athletes and entities. Olympikus signed agreements with Claudinei Quirino, Gustavo Borges, Vanderlei Cordeiro, Maureen Maggi, Gustavo Kuerten, Giba, Bernardinho and Bárbara Leôncio among others. In addition, Olympikus started a partnership with the Brazilian Volleyball Confederation (1997), the Brazilian Athletics Confederation (1999) and the Brazilian Olympic Committee (1999).

The brand entered to football market in 2009, signining deals with Flamengo and Cruzeiro. Olympikus also expanded to Argentina, serving as exclusive kit provider of clubs Racing, Lanús, Argentinos Juniors and Rosario Central.

In 2007 Olympikus was chosen as one of the official sponsors of the Pan American Games held in Rio de Janeiro. The brand not only sponsored the event, but the Brazilian delegation.

Sponsorships 
The following list that are or have been sponsored by Olympikus:

Olympic Committees
  Brazil (1999–2011)

Athleticism

Associations 
  Brazil (1999–2011)

Athletes

  Maurren Maggi (2000–04)
  Claudinei da Silva (2000–04)
  Bárbara Leôncio

Association football

Association
  Rockgol

Clubs teams 

  Argentinos Juniors (2010–13) 
  Lanús (2009–2013)
  Racing (2010–13)
  Rosario Central (2012–14)
  Cruzeiro (2012–14)
  Grêmio (1980–82)
  Flamengo (2009–2012)
  Internacional (1984–86)

Basketball

Club teams
  Flamengo (2008-2012)

Volleyball

Association
  CBV (1997–2016)

National teams

  Argentina (2008–2015)
  Brazil (2000–16)

Club teams

  Bolívar
  Campinas (1996–99)
  Olympikus Telesp (1994–99)
  Finasa Osasco (2009–2012)
  Sesc Flamengo (2008–2012)

Athletes

  Bruno Rezende (2009–present)
  Fabiana Alvim (2009–2012)
  Giba (1997–2014)
  Murilo Endres
  Paula Pequeno (2009-2012)

Swimming

Athletes
  Gustavo Borges (2000)

Rugby

Club teams
  Liceo Naval (2009–2017)

Tennis

Athletes
  Gustavo Kuerten (2002–03)

References

External links 
 

Sporting goods manufacturers of Brazil
Clothing companies established in 1975
Sportswear brands
Athletic shoe brands
Companies based in Bahia
Brazilian brands
Brazilian companies established in 1975